Radhan is an Indian music composer. He made his debut with the Tamil-language film Vikadakavi (2011), before going on to work on Telugu films. He became popular in Telugu through the film Andala Rakshasi (2012). Few of his most popular compositions include Vaaliba Raja (2014), Darling 2 (2016), Arjun Reddy (2017), Manasuku Nachindi (2018), Husharu (2018), Boomerang (2019), and Adithya Varma (2019).

Career 
Radhan made his debut as a composer for the Tamil-language film Vikadakavi (2011). He then worked on the Telugu film Andala Rakshasi (2012). Radhan subsequently worked on the comedy film Valeba Raja (2016), which had its audio released by Kamal Haasan in July 2014.

In 2015, Radhan returned to compose music for Telugu films and worked on Yevade Subramanyam, for which a Times of India critic noted Radhan "has delivered a blend of commercial and good classy tunes". He also completed composing the musical score for India's first web series Happy to be Single.

Discography 

Bold text=== Released soundtracks ===
 The films are listed in the order that the music released, regardless of the date the film released.
 The year next to the title of the affected films indicates the release year of the either dubbed or remade version in the named language later than the original version.

Films

Television

References 

Living people
Telugu film score composers
Telugu people
Tamil musicians
Year of birth missing (living people)